The following squads and players competed in the European Women's Handball Championship in 2002 in Denmark.

Austria 

Nataliya Rusnatchenko
 Beate Hofmann
 Sylvia Strass
Birgit Engl
Rima Sypkus
 Renata Cieloch 
Stephanie Ofenböck
 Manuela Szivatz
Sorina Teodorovic
Ausra Fridrikas
 Edith Mika 
Laura Fritz
Barbara Strass
 Dagmar Müller
Katrin Engel
 Alexandra Materzok

Belarus 

 Natallia Petrakova
 Alena Abramovich
 Natallia Nalivaika 
 Raisa Tsikhanovich 
 Alla Matushkowitz
 Natallia Siarko
 Larissa Heil 
 Iryna Artsiomenka
 Krystsina Svatko 
 Natallia Artsiomenka 
 Alesia Kurchankova 
 Hanna Halinskaya 
 Tatsiana Silitch 
 Tatsiana Khlimankova 
 Natallia Siarko
 Irina Kalpakova

Czech Republic 

 Lenka Cerna
 Vendula Ajglova
 Iva Zamorska 
 Lucie Fabikova 
 Martina Knytlova
 Simona Roubinkova 
 Alena Polaskova 
 Marta Adamkova
 Lenka Romanova 
 Marcela Handlova
 Petra Valova 
 Petra Cumplova 
 Jana Simerska 
 Katerina Vaskova
 Pavla Skavronkova

Denmark 

 Lene Rantala
 Karin Mortensen
 Ditte Andersen
 Mette Vestergaard 
 Christina Roslyng Hansen
 Heidi Johansen
 Rikke Hörlykke Jörgensen
 Winnie Mölgaard
 Trine Jensen 
 Katrine Fruelund 
 Kristine Andersen 
 Karen Brödsgaard 
 Line Daugaard 
 Josephine Touray 
 Louise Bager Nörgaard
 Camilla Thomsen

France 

Joanne Dudziak
Valérie Nicolas
Christiane Vanparys-Torres
Sandrine Delerce-Mariot
Melinda Szabó
Nodjalem Myaro
Véronique Pecqueux-Rolland
 Myriame Said Mohamed
Stéphanie Cano
Isabelle Wendling
Myriam Korfanty
Stéphanie Ludwig
 Alexandra Castioni 
Raphaelle Tervel
Sophie Herbrecht
 Stephanie Moreau

Germany 

 Sabine Englert
 Christine Lindemann
 Nadine Härdter
 Ingrida Radzeviciute 
 Anika Ziercke 
 Maren Baumbach
 Nadine Krause 
 Janet Grunow
 Nikola Pietzsch 
 Melanie Wagner 
 Kathrin Blacha 
 Heike Ahlgrimm
 Heike Schmidt 
 Stefanie Melbeck
 Corina Christenau

Hungary 

 Tímea Sugár
 Katalin Pálinger
 Ibolya Mehlmann
 Ildikó Pádár
 Erika Kirsner
 Helga Németh
 Hortenzia Szrnka
 Anita Görbicz
 Krisztina Pigniczki
 Ágnes Farkas
 Beatrix Balogh
 Eszter Siti
 Tímea Tóth
 Anita Kulcsár
 Zsuzsanna Lovász
 Orsolya Vérten

Netherlands 

 Joke Nynke Tienstra
 Ingeborg Vlietstra
 Diane Ordelmans-Roelofsen
 Monique Feijen 
 Ana Razdorov 
 Maria Turnhout 
 Martine Hekman
 Andrea Groot
 Diane Lamein
 Natasaja Burgers 
 Olga Anne Maria Assink 
 Irina Pusic 
 Sylvia Hofman
 Pearl Chantal Van der Wissel
 Saskia Roukema
 Marieke van der Wal

Norway 

 Heidi Marie Tjugum
 Mimi J. Kopperud Slevigen
 Tonje Larsen 
 Katja Nyberg 
 Else-Marthe Sörlie-Lybekk 
 Monica Sandve
 Mia Therese Hundvin 
 Gro Hammerseng
 Janne Tuven 
 Herdis Birgitte Saettem 
 Elisabeth Hilmo
 Anette Hovind Johansen
 Vigdis Haarsaker 
 Lina C. Olsson Rosenberg 
 Kari Anne Henriksen

Romania 

 Ildiko Kerekes Barbu
 Luminita Hutupan Dinu
 Carmen Liliana Nitescu 
 Gabriela Doina Hobjila Tanase
 Carmen Andreea Amariei 
 Ionela Goran 
 Anna Maria Lazer 
 Aurelia Bradeanu 
 Alina Nicoleta Dobrin 
 Cristina Georgiana Varzaru 
 Steluta Luca
 Petronica Maria Fedorneac
 Aurica Valeria Bese 
 Nicoleta Cristina Gisca

Russia 

Maria Sidorova
Svetlana Bogdanova
Natalia Shipilova
 Elena Tschaoussova 
Oksana Romenskaya
Liudmila Bodnieva
Nadezda Muravyeva
 Anna Ignattchenko
Emiliya Turey
 Maria Koltchina
Irina Poltoratskaya
 Anna Kurepta
 Marina Naukovich
 Oxana Pal 
 Tatiana Dyadetchenko

Slovenia 

 Sergeja Stefanisin
 Barbara Gorski
 Olga Ceckova 
 Branka Mijatovic
 Mihaela Ciora
 Deja Doler 
 Silvana Ilic 
 Vesna Vincic-Pus
 Spela Cerar
 Tanja Dajcman
 Nadija Plesko
 Mira Vincic
 Tatjana Oder 
 Anja Freser 
 Nada Tunjic
 Katja Kurent Tatarovac

Spain 

 Maria Eugenia Sanchez Bravo
 Aitziber Elejaga Vargas
 Elisabet Lopez Valledor
 Noelia Oncina Morena
 Susana Pareja Ibarra
 Diana Box Alonso 
 Montserrat Puche Diaz 
 Marta Elisabet Mangue Gonzales
 Lidia Sanchez Alias
 Susana Fraile Celaya 
 Isabel Maria Ortuno Torrico 
 Maria Teresa Andreu Rodriguez 
 Cristina Esmeralda Lopez Quiros 
 Cristina Gomez Arquer 
 Veronica Maria Cuadrado Dehesa
 Patricia Alonso Jimenez

Sweden 

 Jenny Holmgren
Madelene Grundström
 Veronica Isaksson 
Kristina Linea Flognman
Matilda Linnea Boson
 Anna Ljungdahl Rapp 
 Jennie Florin 
 Theresa Claesson-Andreasson 
 Helena Andersson
 Erika Nilsson 
 Lina Möller 
 Madelene Olsson 
Sara Eriksson
Asa Elisabeth Eriksson
Theresa Utkovic

Ukraine 

 Nataliya Borysenko
 Irina Hontcharova
 Svitlana Morozova 
 Natasa Kotenko
 Oksana Sakada
 Maryna Vergelyuk 
 Olena Iatsenko 
 Ganna Syukalo 
 Natalia Horova 
 Oksana Raykhel 
 Vita Lutkova
 Olena Reznir 
 Tetyana Nykytenko 
 Nataliya Martynienko
 Larysa Kharlanyuk 
 Liliya Stolpakova

Yugoslavia 

 Zlatka Paplacko
 Branka Jovanovic
Tatjana Medved
 Sanja Jovovic 
 Dragana Lakovic
 Ljiljana Knezevic
 Biljana Balac
 Marina Rokic
 Snezana Damjanac 
Maja Savic
 Aida Selmanovic
Bojana Petrovic
Tanja Milanovic
 Dragica Milickovic
Dragica Djuric
 Zoranca Stefanovic

References 

European Handball Championship squads